(born July 28, 1942 in Tokyo) is a Japanese cellist. He started to study music under the tutorship of Hideo Saito, founder of the Tokyo Conservatory.

Tsutsumi made his debut as cellist when he was 12 years old with the Tokyo Philharmonic and at 18 he gave his first concert tour as soloist with the NHK Symphony Orchestra throughout India, Russia and Europe. He was granted a Fulbright Scholarship to study at Indiana University with János Starker. He won first prize at the Pablo Casals International Cello Competition in 1963 at Budapest. He completed his Artist Diploma in Instrumental Performance at Indiana University in 1965 and was offered a position the following year by Western University, where he performed and taught until 1984. Tsutsumi was with Western University from 1966 to 1984 and later with Illinois University. From 1988 to 2006 he was professor of cello at Indiana University. He has been Visiting Professor of cello at Seoul National University of the Arts since 2017, where one of his students won 1st place at the 2019 David Popper International Cello Competition. He was a jurist at the 2019 Tchaikovsky International Cello Competition in Moscow.

His concert performances have taken him around the world to perform as soloist with the most important orchestras, including the Vienna Philharmonic Orchestra, the Royal Concertgebouw Orchestra of Amsterdam, the Leipzig Gewandhaus Orchestra, the Chicago Symphony Orchestra, the Boston Symphony Orchestra, the National Symphony Orchestra of Washington D.C., the Munich Philharmonic, the ORTF or Orchestre National de France, Berlin Radio Symphony Orchestra, Netherlands Chamber Orchestra, the Rotterdam Philharmonic, London's  Philharmonia Orchestra, the Royal Liverpool Philharmonic, the Czech Philharmonic, the Warsaw Philharmonic, the Accademia Nazionale di Santa Cecilia of Rome, the Indianapolis Symphony, the Toronto Symphony and Vancouver Symphony orchestras, among many others. He has toured Japan with Canada's National Arts Centre Orchestra of Ottawa. He has participated in festivals such as the Algoma Fall, Banff, Guelph Spring, Ontario Place, and Stratford in Canada, and the Ravinia in the United States.

He has appeared with the most prestigious maestros: Seiji Ozawa, Giuseppe Sinopoli, Mstislav Rostropovich, Valery Gergiev, Zdenek Kosler (with whom he recorded the Dvorak Cello Concerto with the Czech Philharmonic Orchestra for CBS/Sony Records), Eiji Oue and the musicians Gervase de Peyer, Ronald Turini (with whom he recorded the complete Beethoven sonatas for cello and piano for CBS/Sony Records), Emanuel Ax, Yo-Yo Ma, Nobuko Imai, Steven Staryk, Adele Marcus, James Campbell, Wolfgang Sawallisch (with whom he recorded the two Brahms sonatas for cello and piano for CBS/Sony Records), and many others. He has recorded the Bach solo cello suites on three different occasions for CBS/Sony recordings.

He is beloved throughout the world of cello students because he is the cellist on most of the famous Suzuki CDs which accompany the Suzuki cello practice books. Tsutsumi's style and intonation in these recordings inspire thousands of students every day when they practice along with him.

Among the many distinctions received, he was awarded the 1970 Suntory Music Award for his contribution to the world of music.

In November 2009, Tsutsumi was awarded with a Medal of Honour with purple ribbon by the Government of Japan.

He is married to playwright and scholar Harue Tsutsumi.

References

1942 births
Japanese classical cellists
Japanese classical musicians
Japanese music educators
Living people
Recipients of the Medal with Purple Ribbon
21st-century Japanese musicians
21st-century Japanese educators
20th-century Japanese educators
20th-century Japanese musicians
20th-century cellists
21st-century cellists